SCTV may refer to:

SCTV (TV network), an Indonesian television network
Second City Television, a Canadian sketch comedy television program
Sichuan Radio and Television, a Chinese television station
Seven Regional, formerly Southern Cross Television, a television station throughout regional Australia
South Coast Television, formerly South Coast Community Television, a deflector and Digital TV service in County Cork, Ireland